"Lonely Too Long" is a song written by Bill Rice, Sharon Vaughn and Mike Lawler, and recorded by American country music artist Patty Loveless.  It was released in August 1996 as the third single from her eight album, The Trouble with the Truth (1996). It charted for 20 weeks on the US Billboard Hot Country Singles and Tracks chart, reaching No. 1 during the week of November 16, 1996.

The song was originally recorded by Doug Stone, whose version was never released.

Critical reception
Reviews of the song were positive. Larry Flick from Billboard noted that Loveless' voice "exudes a variety of emotion on this well-written tune". Wendy Newcomer from Cash Box wrote, "Loveless’ delicate explanation of “the morning after” is as inviting and seductive as the night before in “Lonely Too Long”. “Well good morning/Tell me how did you sleep last night/You’re still smiling/So we must have done something right...” With a voice as honest and forthcoming and Loveless’, listeners will find it hard to turn her away."

Charts

Weekly charts

Year-end charts

References

1996 singles
1995 songs
Patty Loveless songs
Songs written by Bill Rice
Songs written by Sharon Vaughn
Song recordings produced by Emory Gordy Jr.
Epic Records singles